Peter John Freyd (born February 5, 1936) is an American mathematician, a professor at the University of Pennsylvania, known for work in category theory and for founding the False Memory Syndrome Foundation.

Mathematics 
Freyd obtained his Ph.D. from Princeton University in 1960; his dissertation, on Functor Theory, was written under the supervision of Norman Steenrod and David Buchsbaum.

Freyd is best known for his adjoint functor theorem. He was the author of the foundational book Abelian Categories: An Introduction to the Theory of Functors (1964). This work culminates in a proof of the Freyd–Mitchell embedding theorem.

In addition, Freyd's name is associated with the HOMFLYPT polynomial of knot theory, and he and Andre Scedrov originated the concept of (mathematical) allegories.

In 2012, he became a fellow of the American Mathematical Society.

False Memory Syndrome Foundation 

Freyd and his wife Pamela founded the False Memory Syndrome Foundation in 1992, after Freyd was accused of sexual abuse by his daughter Jennifer. Peter Freyd denied the accusations. Three years after its founding, it had more than 7,500 members. As of December 2019, the False Memory Syndrome Foundation was dissolved.

Publications 
  Reprinted with a forward as 
 Peter J. Freyd and Andre Scedrov: Categories, Allegories. North-Holland (1999). .

References

External links 
 
 Printable versions of Abelian categories, an introduction to the theory of functors.

Living people
20th-century American mathematicians
21st-century American mathematicians
Category theorists
University of Pennsylvania faculty
Mathematicians at the University of Pennsylvania
Princeton University alumni
Fellows of the American Mathematical Society
1936 births
People from Evanston, Illinois
Mathematicians from Illinois